The Morondava river in Menabe region, is located in western Madagascar. It originates on the Makay Massif and flows northwestwards into the Indian Ocean near the town with the same name: Morondava.

Dams
The Dabara dam.

References 

Rivers of Madagascar
Rivers of Menabe